Ingeborg-Drewitz-Literaturpreis für Gefangene is a literary prize of Germany.

German literary awards